The 1927 Lehigh Brown and White football team was an American football team that represented Lehigh University as an independent during the 1927 college football season. In its third and final season under head coach Percy Wendell, the team compiled a 1–7–1 record and was outscored by a total of 196 to 31. The team played its home games at Taylor Stadium in Bethlehem, Pennsylvania.

Schedule

References

Lehigh
Lehigh Mountain Hawks football seasons
Lehigh football